The Passumpsic Railroad was located in Barnet, Vermont. The railroad had the only operable steam locomotive in Vermont. Their steam engine was a two-truck Heisler that ran on the Phenix Marble Company.

The Passumpsic Railroad was owned by Marvin Kendall and was located along route 5 south of St. Johnsbury.

The railroad had or has the locomotive named Phenix Marble Company 1.

References

External links

Rail transportation in Vermont